Michelangelo Falvetti (December 25, 1642 – 1693) was an Italian Baroque composer as well as a Catholic priest.

Falvetti was born in Melicuccà in Calabria, Kingdom of Naples on December 25, 1642, but spent most of his life and musical career in the Kingdom of Sicily. In 1670, he became Maestro di cappella in Palermo, and in 1678 founded the 'Unione dei Musici' in that city. In or around 1682 he moved to Messina where he was named Maestro di Cappella del Senato di Messina. Falvetti died in Messina in 1693.

Works, editions and recordings
Works written in Palermo:
 Abel figura dell'agnello eucaristico (1676)
 La spada di Gedeone (1678)
 La Giuditta (1680)
 Il trionfo dell'anima (16??)

Works written in Messina:
 Il diluvio universale (1682) - includes sung parts for Noah, Rad, Water, Death, Divine Justice, God, Human Nature, - recording Leonardo García-Alarcón, La Cappella Mediterranea, Choeur de chambre de Namur. Ambronay 2011
 Il Nabucco (1683) - recording Leonardo García-Alarcón, La Cappella Mediterranea, Choeur de chambre de Namur. Ambronay 2013
 Il sole fermato da Giosuè (1692)

References

External links 

1642 births
1692 deaths
Italian Baroque composers
Italian male classical composers
People from the Province of Reggio Calabria
17th-century Italian Roman Catholic priests
17th-century Italian composers
17th-century male musicians